Goodenia microptera  is a species of flowering plant in the family Goodeniaceae and is endemic to the Pilbara region of Western Australia. It is an erect to ascending, sprawling herb with narrow oblong to lance-shaped leaves sometimes with teeth on the edges, and racemes of yellow flowers with a brownish centre.

Description
Flowering mainly occurs from March to August and the fruit is a flattened spherical capsule  in diameter.

Taxonomy and naming
Goodenia microptera was first formally described in 1862 by Ferdinand von Mueller in Fragmenta Phytographiae Australiae from specimens collected by P. Walcott near Nickol Bay.
The specific epithet (microptera) means "small-winged".

Distribution and habitat
This goodenia grows on plains, sand dunes and limestone ridges in the Pilbara region of Western Australia.

Conservation status
Goodenia microptera is classified as "not threatened" by the Government of Western Australia Department of Parks and Wildlife.

References

microptera
Eudicots of Western Australia
Plants described in 1862
Taxa named by Ferdinand von Mueller
Endemic flora of Western Australia